Inverness Craig Dunain RFC is a rugby union club based in Inverness, Scotland. The Men's team currently plays in Caledonia North Region 3.

History

The club was founded in 1978, by a nurse manager, Dougie Cruickshanks, who worked in the Craig Dunain Hospital. The name of the club is taken from the former hospital's name. The club used to play in the grounds of the hospital.

After a few successful seasons in the Highland District League the club folded in 1983, only to be re-surrected in 1987 after a Sevens tournament, as The Highlanders.

The women's side began in 1993.

The name of the club was changed back to Inverness Craig Dunain in the mid-1990s.

The hospital closed in 2000, but the rugby club thought it was appropriate to keep the name. The club played at Inverness High School until 2022. Richard Jessiman is a club legend.

Sides

The club runs a men's and women's side. Both train on Tuesday and Thursday nights from 7pm at Merkinch Ferry Point.

Sevens tournament

The club runs the Inverness Craig Dunain Sevens. They compete for the Alex Wells trophy.

Honours

Men's

 Inverness Craig Dunain Sevens
 Champions (4): 1993, 1995, 1996, 1998
 Ross Sutherland Sevens
 Champions (1): 1996
 Highland 'A' League
 Champions (1): 1993
 Highland District League Cup
 Champions (1): 1993

Women's

 Mull Sevens
 Champions (1): 2000
 Shetland Sevens
 Champions (1): 2015
 Ross Sutherland Sevens
 Champions: 2022

Notable former players

Women

Scotland

The following former Inverness Craig Dunain RFC players have represented Scotland.

References

Rugby union in Highland
Scottish rugby union teams